Tammy MacLeod (born 3 August 1956) is a Canadian diver. She competed in the women's 10 metre platform event at the 1976 Summer Olympics.

In February 1973, she won the Australian junior under-16s 1-metre and 3-metre diving events and was runner-up in the 10m-metre tower event. She was part of the Simon Fraser diving team.

References

External links
 

1956 births
Living people
Canadian female divers
Olympic divers of Canada
Divers at the 1976 Summer Olympics
Divers from Vancouver
20th-century Canadian women